Biomphalaria alexandrina is a species of air-breathing freshwater snail, an aquatic pulmonate gastropod mollusk in the family Planorbidae, the ram's horn snails and their allies.

Distribution 
This species occur in Egypt

Habitat 
Biomphalaria alexandrina lives in freshwater, for example in irrigation canals.

Feeding habits 
In captivity, Biomphalaria alexandrina can be fed on boiled leaves of lettuce.

Parasites 
Biomphalaria alexandrina serves as an intermediate host for Schistosoma mansoni

Hybrid 
There is a known hybrid Biomphalaria glabrata × Biomphalaria alexandrina, from Egypt.

Phylogeny 
A cladogram showing phylogenic relations of species in the genus Biomphalaria:

References

Further reading 
 

Biomphalaria